Johannes Maccovius (1588 – 24 June 1644), also known as Jan Makowski, was a Polish Reformed theologian.

Early travels and personal life
Makowski was born in Lobzenica, Poland.  After visiting various universities (1607 in Danzig, 1610 in Marburg, 1611 in Heidelberg) and as the tutor of young Polish nobles, holding disputations with Jesuits and Socinians, Maccovius entered the University of Franeker in the Netherlands, in 1613.  There he became privat-docent in 1614 and professor of theology in 1615.  In later years, the fame of Maccovius attracted many students to Franeker, where he spent the rest of his life.

The first of his three wives was Antje van Uylenburgh, a sister of painter Rembrandt's wife Saskia van Uylenburgh, who, around the time she and Rembrandt married in 1634, helped him out after Antje's death.

Doctrine

Theologically, Maccovius was a Calvinist, of the supralapsarian school, and possessed theses of a corresponding nature, defended in 1616 by one of his pupils, involved him in a controversy with his colleague Sibrandus Lubbertus which was settled only by the Synod of Dort in 1619.  The synod, while neither approving or condemning his supralapsarianism, acquitted Maccovius of the charges of heresy brought against him, but advised him to be more cautious and peaceable.

Nevertheless, he became involved in another controversy at Dort with his subsequent colleague William Ames by asserting that all things that must be believed are not necessarily true, that no impulse toward regeneration and effecting it exists in the unregenerate, and that Christ is the object of faith because of whom, but not in whom, man must believe.

Maccovius' theory of Scripture was very free, and he distinguished sharply between scholarship and beliefs essential to salvation.

Chief works
. Amsterdam, 1623.
. Franeker, 1647, published posthumously.
. Franeker, 1650.
. Franeker 1652, 1656.
. Amsterdam, 1660.

Translations

W. J. van Asselt, M.D. Bell, and R. Ferwerda, ed. and trans. Scholastic Discourse: Johannes Maccovius (1588–1644) on Theological and Philosophical Distinctions and Rules. Publications of the Institute for Reformation Research. Apeldoorn: , 2009. (Translation of )

Further reading
A. Kuyper, Jr., Johannes Maccovius, Leyden, 1899.
E. L. Briemoet, pp. 151–160, Leeuwarden, 1758.
M.D. Bell, ": the doctrine of the object of predestination in the theology of Johannes Maccovius". Ph.D. Thesis: Westminster Theological Seminary, 1986.
M.D. Bell, "Maccovius (1588-1644) on the Son of God as " in Church History and Religious Culture 91 (2011), 105-119.
W. B. S. Boeles, ii. 90-94, Leeuwarden, 1889.
W. J. van Asselt, "On the Maccovius Affair" in Revisiting the Synod of Dort (1618-1619). Aza Goudriaan and Fred van Lieburg, eds., pp. 217–241. Leiden: Brill, 2011.
W. J. van Asselt, "The Theologian's Toolkit: Johannes Maccovius (1588-1644) and the Development of Reformed Theological Distinctions" in Westminster Theological Journal 68 (2006), 23-40.

References

1588 births
1644 deaths
Dutch Calvinist and Reformed theologians
Dutch people of Polish descent
University of Franeker alumni
Supralapsarians
Academic staff of the University of Franeker
People from Piła County
17th-century Calvinist and Reformed theologians
17th-century Polish philosophers